Runge is a town in Karnes County, Texas, United States. The town is pronounced "Run-Gee". The population was 892 at the 2020 census.

Geography

Runge is located in eastern Karnes County at  (28.885172, –97.712769), along Texas State Highway 72.

Climate

The climate in this area is characterized by hot, humid summers and generally mild to cool winters.  According to the Köppen Climate Classification system, Runge has a humid subtropical climate, abbreviated "Cfa" on climate maps.

Demographics

As of the 2020 United States census, there were 892 people, 461 households, and 357 families residing in the town.

As of the census of 2000, there were 1,080 people, 395 households, and 289 families residing in the town. The population density was 918.7 people per square mile (353.4/km2). There were 461 housing units at an average density of 392.1 per square mile (150.8/km2). The racial makeup of the town was 67.22% White, 2.22% African American, 1.11% Native American, 26.67% from other races, and 2.78% from two or more races. Hispanic or Latino of any race were 74.17% of the population.

There were 395 households, out of which 34.9% had children under the age of 18 living with them, 47.6% were married couples living together, 17.5% had a female householder with no husband present, and 26.6% were non-families. 23.3% of all households were made up of individuals, and 14.2% had someone living alone who was 65 years of age or older. The average household size was 2.73 and the average family size was 3.19.

In the town, the population was spread out, with 32.2% under the age of 18, 5.9% from 18 to 24, 25.5% from 25 to 44, 19.4% from 45 to 64, and 17.0% who were 65 years of age or older. The median age was 34 years. For every 100 females, there were 88.5 males. For every 100 females age 18 and over, there were 84.4 males.

The median income for a household in the town was $20,417, and the median income for a family was $22,738. Males had a median income of $20,667 versus $16,375 for females. The per capita income for the town was $8,480. About 27.7% of families and 31.3% of the population were below the poverty line, including 40.9% of those under age 18 and 40.4% of those age 65 or over.

Education
The town is served by the Runge Independent School District.

Notable people
 Claude Davenport, former Major League Baseball player
 Mike Gisler, former National Football League offensive lineman
 John Yanta, Roman Catholic Bishop Emeritus of Amarillo, former Auxiliary Bishop of San Antonio

References

Towns in Karnes County, Texas
Towns in Texas